Turkey competed at the 1948 Summer Olympics in London, England. 58 competitors, 57 men and 1 woman, took part in 42 events in 7 sports.

Medalists

Athletics

Cycling

Four cyclists, all male, represented Turkey in 1948

Individual road race
 Ali Çetiner
 Mustafa Osmanlı
 Orhan Suda
 Talat Tunçalp

Team road race
 Ali Çetiner
 Mustafa Osmanlı
 Orhan Suda
 Talat Tunçalp

Equestrian

Fencing

Six fencers, all men, represented Turkey in 1948.

Men's foil
 Nihat Balkan
 Nejat Tulgar

Men's sabre
 Sabri Tezcan
 Rıza Arseven
 Merih Sezen

Men's team sabre
 Merih Sezen, Nihat Balkan, Rıza Arseven, Sabri Tezcan, Vural Balcan

Football

Wrestling

Art competitions

References

External links
Official Olympic Reports
International Olympic Committee results database

Nations at the 1948 Summer Olympics
1948
1948 in Turkish sport